The Anguilla Formation is a geologic formation in Anguilla. It preserves fossils dating back to the Burdigalian to Serravallian period.

See also 

 List of fossiliferous stratigraphic units in Anguilla

References

Further reading 
 A. F. Budd, K.G. Johnson, and J.C. Edwards. 1995. Caribbean reef coral diversity during the Early to Middle Miocene: an Example from the Anguilla Formation. Coral Reefs 14(2):109-117

Geologic formations of the Caribbean
Geography of Anguilla
Neogene Caribbean
Burdigalian
Langhian
Serravallian
Limestone formations
Reef deposits